The June 4th Revolution or June 4th Uprising was an uprising in Ghana in 1979 that arose due to a combination of corruption and perceived bad governance. This led to frustration among the general public and misunderstandings within the Ghanaian army.

Cause
The revolution began when the military government of the Supreme Military Council (SMC II), consisting of Lieutenant General Fred Akuffo, put Flight Lieutenant Jerry John Rawlings on public trial for attempting to overthrow the government on May 15th,1979. This happened when Rawlings, a junior soldier in the Ghanaian Army , and other Ghanaian soldiers were not given their salaries. 

Rawlings turned the trial against the government by accusing it of massive corruption and requesting his fellow accused to be set free as he was solely responsible for the mutiny. He was publicly sentenced to death and imprisoned. His verbal attack against the government resonated with the afflicted nation.

On the night of June 3rd 1979, junior military officers, including Major Boakye Djan, broke into the jail where Rawlings was held and helped free him. They then marched him to the national radio station to make an announcement. The first time the public heard from Rawlings was a statement that Rawlings had been released by the junior officers and that he was under their command. He requested all soldiers to meet with him at the Nicholson Stadium in Burma Camp, in Accra.

The entire nation was in uproar. The soldiers rounded up senior military officers including three former heads of states, General Fred Akuffo, Ignatius Kutu Acheampong and Africa for trial. They were executed by a firing squad.

Aftermath
Rawlings was then appointed the head of the Armed Forces Revolutionary Council (AFRC) by the revolting junior military officers to run the country until the ongoing election was completed.

Rawlings handed over his Power to Dr. Hilla Limann in September 1979. But Rawlings again overthrew Limann's Government on 31 December 1981.

Though June 4th became a noted date in Ghana's history, it has been said to be a date that brings a lot of pain to people who either lost loved ones, lost businesses or had to flee the country.

See also
 History of Ghana (1966–79)

References

Bibliography
 Amamoo, Joseph G., "The Ghanaian Revolution", p. 190, iUniverse (2000),  
 Ninsin, Kwame A., "Issues in Ghana's Electoral Politics", p. 40, CODESRIA (2017),  
 Gocking, Roger, "The History of Ghana", Greenwood Publishing Group (2005), p. 212,  
 New York Times : "Hard. Times Follow Ghana Coup" (30 July 1979) 
 El País : "Los golpistas de Ghana prometen elecciones este mes" (6 June 1979) 

Military coups in Ghana
1970s coups d'état and coup attempts
1979 in Ghana
Conflicts in 1979
20th-century revolutions
History of Ghana